Undergroove Records was founded as a British underground metal record label in 1998 by Darren Sadler. The label has since become much more open minded releasing everything from the post-rock of Aereogramme to the trip hop influenced grooves of 27.

Current bands
 27
 3 Stages of Pain
 Aereogramme
 Aped Bi-Sapien
 Ariel-X
 B Movie Heroes
 Black Eye Riot
 Charger
 Co-Exist
 Cubic Space Division
 Down I Go
 Drive Like You Stole It
 Dweller
 Eden Maine
 Exit International
 The Mirimar Disaster
 GU Medicine
 Hexes
 Johnny Truant
 Lack
 Lazarus Blackstar
 Matter
 Minus the Bear
 My Ruin
 Servers
 Sika Redem
 Sorry and the Sinatras
 Spider Kitten
 Take a Worm for a Walk Week
 The Abominable Iron Sloth
 The Ghost of a Thousand
 The Murder of Rosa Luxemburg
 The Yo-Yo's
 Trashlight Vision
 Twin Zero

See also
 List of record labels
 List of independent UK record labels

References

External links
 Official site
 Undergroove Records feature on Rockmidgets.com

British independent record labels
Record labels established in 1998
Alternative rock record labels